At the 1970 British Commonwealth Games, the athletics events were held at the Meadowbank Stadium in Edinburgh, Scotland. A total of 36 events were contested, of which 23 by male and 13 by female athletes. This was the first athletics competition at the British Commonwealth Games to feature events in metric units, rather than imperial units. One world record and two Games records were broken at the competition.

Medal summary

Men

Women

Medal table

Participating nations

 (7)
 (33)
 (12)
 (2)
 (59)
 (1)
 (92)
 (1)
 (6)
 (12)
 (7)
 (2)
 (5)
 (2)
 (9)
 (4)
 (22)
 (18)
 (7)
 (7)
 (20)
 (21)
 (19)
 (9)
 (1)
 (55)
 (5)
 (4)
 (5)
 (8)
 (12)
 (15)
 (41)
 (11)

References
Commonwealth Games Medallists - Men. GBR Athletics. Retrieved on 2010-07-21.
Commonwealth Games Medallists - Women. GBR Athletics. Retrieved on 2010-07-21.

 
1970 British Commonwealth Games events
1970
British Commonwealth Games
1970 British Commonwealth Games